The EUR-pallet, also known as Euro-pallet or EPAL-pallet, is the standard European pallet as specified by the UIC pallet working group and the UIC 435-2 leaflet. Pallets conforming to the standardization are eligible for the European Pallet Pool (EPP), the system which allows for an exchange as "pallet for pallet".

The weight of a EUR/EPAL-pallet (EPAL 1) is approx. 25 kg. Around 450-500 million EUR-pallets are in circulation.

The safe working load of a EUR/EPAL-pallet is 1,500 kg. The maximum additional load can be up to 4,000 kg when stacking. 

History

The Euro-pallet dates back to the wooden pallets used in railway transport. In 1961 the European railways commissioned the standardization of a common pallet type under the auspices of the UIC. The inventors were the Svensson brothers of Gyllsjö, Skåne, Sweden. Using the Euro-pallet, it was possible to load railroad cars in just 10% of the time of earlier loading processes. In 1968 the association also specified a standard lattice box along with a standard lattice box pallet.

Following the standardization most of the European industry switched over to use Euro-pallets with trucks, forklifts and high-rack warehouses optimized for their size. National associations developed framework agreements for pallet exchange in that freight would be delivered on Euro-pallets and be given the same number of Euro-pallets in return ("pallet for pallet"). The Euro-pallets are controlled by the association and the association takes care of repairing or removing old pallets from the pool. With the ongoing European integration, the European Pallet Pool allowed for pallet exchange even in cross-border dealings.

With the success of the Euro-pallets, a number of replicas entered the market that used low-quality wood which splintered easily and were prone to mold. So the European railways, which own the trademarks for EUR/EPAL, created a separate standardization body. EPAL, the European Pallet Association e.V., was founded in 1991, and the EUR and EPAL logo may only be used by licensees of that organization. EPAL assumed responsibility for the safety and quality of all pooled pallets in 2016.

Globalization has made for a decline of the EUR/EPAL system since the EUR-pallets do not fit well into ISO containers. It is still the most widespread pallet type in the world, with an estimate of 350 to 500 million EUR-pallets being in circulation. One of the advantages is that the  width fits through normal doors (the most common DIN door type is ).

Derivatives of the EUR-pallet have been developed for specific uses. For use in retail stores, the EUR-6-pallet is half the size of the EUR-pallet, . ISO standards have also been published for these Euro-pallet types.

To accommodate EUR-pallets, there are derivative intermodal containers that are about  wider — these are commonly known as "pallet-wide" containers. Especially the  pallet-wide high-cube shortsea container has gained wide acceptance, as these containers can replace the A-Behälter swap bodies with a length of  that are common for truck transport in Europe. The EU has started a standardization for pallet-wide containerization in the EILU (European Intermodal Loading Unit) initiative.

Specification

The EUR-pallet's dimensions are defined in the following standards:
 UIC 435-2 Standard of quality for EUR flat pallets made of wood measuring 800 mm x 1200 mm (EUR-1)
 ISO 445 Pallets for materials handling - Vocabulary (ISO 445:2008)
 ISO 3676 Packaging–Unit Load Sizes–Dimensions
 ISO 3394 Dimensions of Rigid Rectangular Packages, Transport Packages.
 ISO 8611-1 Pallets for materials handling
 ISO 8611-1 Pallets for materials handling—Flat pallets—Part 1: Test methods
 ISO 8611-2 Pallets for materials handling—Flat pallets—Part 2: Performance requirements and selection of tests  
 ISO 12776 Pallets—Slip sheets
 ISO 12777-1  Methods of test for pallet joints 
 ISO 12777-1 Methods of test for pallet joints - Part 1: Determination of bending resistance of pallet nails, other dowel-type fasteners and staples
 ISO 12777-2 Methods of test for pallet joints - Part 2: Determination of withdrawal and head pull-through resistance of pallet nails and staples
 ISO 12777-3 Methods of test for pallet joints - Part 3: Determination of strength of pallet joints
 ISO 15629 Pallets for materials handling—Quality of fasteners for assembly of new and repair of used, flat, wooden pallets 
 ISO 18334 Pallets for materials handling—Quality of assembly of new wooden pallets
 ISO 18613 Repair of flat wooden pallets
 EN 13626 Packaging - Box pallets - General requirements and test methods
 EN 13382 Flat pallets for materials handling - Principal dimensions
 EN 13698-1 Pallet production specification
 EN 13698-1 Pallet production specification - Part 1: Construction specification for  flat wooden pallets
 EN 13698-2 Pallet production specification - Part 2: Construction specification for  flat wooden pallets 
 EN 15512 Steel static storage systems - Adjustable pallet racking systems - Principles for structural design 
 EN 15620 Steel static storage systems - Adjustable pallet racking - Tolerances, deformations and clearances

Materials and identification
The EUR-pallet must use at least 78 nails of a specific type that are subject to a prescribed nailing pattern. The final pallet weighs . Only dry wood may be used, to reduce the risk of mold.

Each EUR-pallet bears a number of quality marks:

 On the left corner leg the EPAL logo is shown. Originally this was used for the railway company designation that was eligible to control the Euro-pallet production. Since the control was moved to the EPAL, many framework agreements require the EPAL logo.
 On the central leg the code of the producer company is shown along with the signature of the verifier and the name of the railway company that installed the verifier.  If the EUR-pallet has been repaired already, then a round verification nail is put in the central chunk. The last numbers designate the production year and possibly the type of wood.
 On the right corner leg the EUR logo is shown.  The EPAL and EUR logos are encircled in an oval that resembles the nationality sticker for cars.

Common types 
The four common sizes of EUR-pallets (alongside ISO alternative sizes) are:

See also 
 Euro container, various sizes of stacking containers which can be stacked together to fill a Euro-pallet

References

External links 
 
 List of companies organized in the EPAL

Pallets
Transport in Europe
Mechanical standards